The Bofors 283 mm M/12 naval gun was a weapon used as the main battery of the Swedish s. It was designed and built by Bofors a few years before the First World War.

Bibliography

External links

 Tony DiGiulian, Sweden 28.3 cm/45 (11.1") Model 1912

 

Bofors
Naval guns of Sweden
Artillery of Sweden
World War II naval weapons
280 mm artillery